Judith R. Clibborn (born 1943) is an American politician who is a member of the Democratic Party. She is a former member of the Washington House of Representatives, where she represented the 41st district from 2003 through 2019.

References

1943 births
Living people
Democratic Party members of the Washington House of Representatives
Women state legislators in Washington (state)
21st-century American politicians
21st-century American women politicians